The Szczecin Equality March (Polish: Szczeciński Marsz Równości) is an annual demonstration in Szczecin for the LGBT rights in Poland, as part of the equality marches in Poland. So far it has been held in 2018 and 2019.

All-Polish Youth sanitization action 
In September 2019, All-Polish Youth, as part of a counterdemonstration against the Szczecin Equality March of 14 September, proposed to organize a manifestation called "We will wash off LGBT, thereby saving families". The plan was to "sanitize" the streets with cleaning supplies and dressed in protective clothing that would be distributed by the members of the group to the participants of the counterdemonstration. Dariusz Matecki, a city council member from the Law and Justice party, supported the counterdemonstration. According to Małgorzata Rudzka, a member of All-Polish Youth: "It is no coincidence that the manifestation takes place during the procession of people who publicly present their sexual deviations. Our manifestation is organized in defense of the traditional values. [It is] washing the streets of pollution associated with LGBT community vices against natural law."

The counterdemonstration plan was met with criticism from some clergy of the Catholic Church. Father Tomasz Szałanda asked "Do they also scrub computers, beds and bathrooms where they themselves sin, just like [they plan with] those pavements? A truly repulsive image." Jesuit priest Grzegorz Kramer said "No, it has nothing to do with the Gospel. No, this is not what the Church teaches. It ends this way if you're a practicing-unbeliever...", referring to the term non-practicing believers that he ironically reversed.

Father Tomasz Kancelarczyk, president of an anti-abortion organization, planned similar action and was supportive of the counterdemonstration at first, but later apologized for the support, acknowledging that the protest is a form of dehumanization, pleading to All-Polish Youth to refrain from their plans.

The Szczecin Equality March was attended by an estimated 6,000 to 8,000 people. The participants were protected from violent counter-demonstrators by police forces. In total, only 50 people participated in the counterdemonstration organized by All-Polish Youth.

References

Equality marches in Poland
Szczecin